Bhagirath Prasad Tripathi (15 July 1935 – 11 May 2022), better known as Vagish Shastri, was an Indian Sanskrit grammarian, linguist, tantra and yogi. In 2018, Government of India awarded him the fourth highest civilian award Padma Shri for his work in the field of literature and education.

Life and career
Shastri was born in the city of Khurai, in Madhya Pradesh in 1934. His primary education was in Khurai, followed by his education in Vrindavan and Benaras. He started his teaching career as a lecturer of Sanskrit at Tikmani Sanskrit College, Varanasi in 1959 and soon he became the Director and Professor of the Research Institute at Sampurnanand Sanskrit University, Varanasi in the year 1970. He served this prestigious academic post for about three decades. 
He received his master's degree Vyākaraņa Āchārya (1959); Ph.D. Vidyāvāridhi in Grammar and Historical Linguistics (1964), German Diploma (1966) and D.Litt. Vāchaspati (1969) from Sampurnanand Sanskrit University.

Contribution
Shastri started to write essays at the age of 19. His more than 200 essays and research papers were published in different journals nationally and internationally.
He was Secretary President of one section in fifth world Sanskrit conferences. He was chief editor of many series such as Sarasvati Bhavana Granthamala he edited more than 300 manuscripts which took form of books. He also was chief editor of famous Sanskrit journal Sarasvati Susama.
He wrote books on different subjects which included grammatical and philological research work, drama, history, poetry, satire, historical research work and metaphysical writings.

Honors and awards

 Padma Shri, awarded by the Government of India President of India, 2018
  Senior Research fellowship, University Grants Commission, 1964–67.
 Kālidasa Award, Highest literary Award, Uttar Pradesh, 1966–67.
 Honored 6 times by Uttar Pradesh Sanskrit Academy, 1968, 1971, 1981, 1985, 1995, 1996.
 Mahāmahopādhyāya, Śri Kashi Pandit Parishad, 1982.
 Bāņa Bhatţţ Award, Uttar Pradesh Sanskrit Academy, 1990.
 Veda-Vedānga Award, Rajasthan Sanskrit Academy, 1994.
 Anusansdhan Puraskāra (Research Award), Utkal Pāti trust, 1995
 Swami Vishnu Tirth Sammāna (Spiritual writing Award), Indore, 2002
 Special Award, Govt. of Uttar Pradesh Sanskrit Sansthan, 2005.
 Special Award, Govt. of Uttar Pradesh Sanskrit Sansthan, 2005.
 Certificate of Honour for Sanskrit, awarded by the President of India, 2013.
 Sauhard Samman, Uttar Pradesh Hindi Sansthan, Lucknow, 2014
 Yash Bharati Samman, Highest Honour of U. P. Govt. Government of Uttar Pradesh, 2015
 Vishva Bharati Samman, Highest Honour in Sanskrit Work, by U. P. Sanskrit Samsthan, Lucknow, 2013
 Mahakavi Kalidas Sanskrit Vrati Samman-2016, Highest Honour in Sanskrit Work, by Kavikulguru Kalidas Sanskrit University, Nagpur
 Rashtriya Chatrasal Samman-2017, by Bundeli Sahitya Parishad, Bhopal.
 Sanskrit Sadhana Samman-"Maharshi VedVyas Samman 2017", by Delhi Sanskrit Academy, New Delhi.
 Honorary D.Litt., 2018, Sampurnanand Sanskrit University, Varanasi.

Books authored
Whitney's principal target in accusing Pāṇini and Pāṇiniyas of unreliability was the Dhatupatha. He set forth his views that of nearly 2000 roots of Dhatupatha published by Westergaard and Bohtlingk more than half of these are not attested in literature. The most ambitious work in the direction noted is Pāniniya Dhātupātha Samikşhā (1965) wherein the author gives an alphabetically arranged catalogue of roots found in different Dhatupathas together with attestation – verbal and nominal forms – in Sanskrit, Pali, Apabhramsa and other Prakrits. BPT Vagish Shastri's professed aim is to refute Whitney's Claim.

The radio drama Krişakānām Nāgpāshah is a symbolic play with the tone and tenor of patriotism which aims at common harmony, pride in one's own nation, and sacrifice for one's motherland which is highly relevant. This is a creative work from the vibrant pen of BPT Vagish Shastri.

Grammatical and philological research work
 Pāniniya Dhātupātha Samikşhā, Sampurnanand Sanskrit University, 1965
 Taddhitantah Kechana Sabdah, Motilal Banarsidass, Delhi, 1967.
 Anusandhana Paddhatih, Sampurnanand Sanskrit University, 1969 (Presently this book is being translated into Telugu, by Sanskrit Department, Waltair University)
 Dhātvartha-Vijnanam, Sampurnanand Sanskrit University, 1980, This is the most ambitious work in the semantics of verbal roots
 Sabda Nirvachana aur Sabdartha, Yogic Voice Consciousness Institute, Varanasi, 2004.
 Gypsy language and Grammar, Yogic Voice Consciousness Institute, Varanasi, 2005.
 Upsahityam, Yogic Voice Consciousness Institute, Varanasi, 2007.

Creative writing in Sanskrit, Hindi and English
His creative writing of drama, story, poetry, satire is present in his books
 Krişakānām Nāgpāshah: A drama concerned with National Awakening, Chaukhamba Vidya Bhavan, Varanasi, 1958.
 Katha Samvartika, (Original Sanskrit Stories), Chaukhamba Vidya Bhavan, Varanasi, 1959.
 Tolstoy Kathasaptakam, (Translation in Sanskrit), Chaukhamba Vidya Bhavan, Varanasi, 1970. (In Sampurnanand Sanskrit University curriculum).
 Bharat Mein Sanskrit ki Anivaryata Kyon, Choukhamba Vidya Bhavan, Varanasi, 1977.
 Sri Ganga Stavana Chayanika, Yogic Voice Consciousness Institute, Varanasi, 1987.
 Sri Siva Stavana Chayanika, Yogic Voice Consciousness Institute, Varanasi, 1989.
 Narma-Saptasati : verse-satires, Education ministry, Uttar Pradesh Sanskrit Academy, 1994.
 Sanskrit Vangmaya Manthanam, Financial support by Ministry of Education, Govt. of India, 1990.
 Atankavada Satakam : Verse critique on Terrorism, Yogic Voice Consciousness Institute, Varanasi, 1992.
 Sasvata Kavya ki Atma, Yogic Voice Consciousness Institute, Varanasi, 2000.
 Jagatika Prema aur Sasvta Ananda, Yogic Voice Consciousness Institute, Varanasi, 2004.
 Humour in Ancient India, Yogic Voice Consciousness Institute, Varanasi, 2004.
 Shabd Nirvachan Aur Shabdarth, Yogic Voice Consciousness Institute, Varanasi, 2007.
 Sanskrit Enhanced Knowledge of West, Vagyoga Chetna Peetham, Varanasi, 2009.
 Sri Vagyoga Tantram, Yogic Voice Consciousness Institute, Varanasi, 2010.
 Nisargsarsanjali, Vagyoga Chetna Peetham, Varanasi, 2013
 Anushandhan Sampadan Pravidhi, Vagyoga Chetna Peetham, Varanasi, 2013
 NAAD SHABDIKAM, Vagyoga Chetna Peetham, Varanasi, 2017
 WHY SANSKRIT, Vagyoga Chetna Peetham, Varanasi, 2017.
 Antyajon ke Prati Hinduvon ka Kartavya, Vagyoga Chetna Peetham, Varanasi, 2017
 NAAD SHABDIKAM, Vagyoga Chetna Peetham, Varanasi, 2017
 SANJYÀKRIYÀPADA-SAMSLESHIKÀ VYÀKRIYÀ, Vagyoga Chetna Peetham, Varanasi, 2017
 SANKSHIPTA SAAR VYAKARAN, Vagyoga Chetna Peetham, Varanasi, 2017
 SHIV SANKALP SUKTAM, Vagyoga Chetna Peetham, Varanasi, 2017

Historical research work
 Bundelkhand Ki Prachinata (Antiquity of (Bundelkand), Self Publication, 1965.
Here refused claim of archaeologist Alexander Cunningham who suggested native place of Bundelas in Maharashtra. This book describes an etymological identification of the mysterious 'pulindas' mentioned in later Vedic, Epic, pauranika and inscriptional literature.
 Gypsy Bhasha : An historical and grammatical study, Yogic Voice Consciousness Institute, Varanasi, 1986.
 Mahakunmbh evam Sangama Snanana : Ek Vaijnanika Vivechana, Yogic Voice Consciousness Institute, Varanasi, 1988.
 Nadiya Ek Ghat Bahutere, Yogic Voice Consciousness Institute, Varanasi, 2001.
 Autobiography of the Vagyogi, Yogic Voice Consciousness Institute, Varanasi, 2003.
 Migration of Aryans from India, Yogic Voice Consciousness Institute, Varanasi, 2007.
 Bundelkhand Ki Prachinata, Enlarged Edition, Vag Yog Chetna Granthmala, Varanasi, 2011.

Metaphysical writing
 Parachetana ki Yatra (Journey to Superconsciousness), Yogic Voice Consciousness Institute, Varanasi, 2000. He trained more than 1000 students from all over the world in Kundalini Meditation, Tantra, Yoga and Philosophy.
 Shakti, Shiva and Yoga, Yogic Voice Consciousness Institute, Varanasi, 2000.
 Yogachudamani Upnishad, Yogic Voice Consciousness Institute, Varanasi, 2004.
 Samvit Prakasha (Vaishnav Tantra), Yogic Voice Consciousness Institute, Varanasi, 2006
 Trayambakam Yajamahe, Yogic Voice Consciousness Institute, Varanasi, 2006.

New Sanskrit grammar
Shastri has published three books on his invented Sanskrit Grammar "Vagyoga Technique".
 Sanskrit Sikahne ki Saral aur Vaijnanika Vidhi, Yogic Voice Consciousness Institute, Varanasi, 1990.
 Vagyoga : Mnemonic Sasnkrit Technique, Yogic Voice Consciousness Institute, Varanasi, 2000.
 Vagyoga : Conversational Sanskrit, Yogic Voice Consciousness Institute, Varanasi, 2001.(Also translated in Russian language, 2009)
 Sanskrit Made Easy : Part – I, Yogic Voice Consciousness Institute, Varanasi, 2012.
 Sanskrit Made Easy : Part – II, Yogic Voice Consciousness Institute, Varanasi, 2016.

Dictionary
 Vamana-Purana Visayanukrama Sabdakosa, Sampurnanand Sanskrit University, (1996).
 Etymological Bundeli Dictionary, Vagyoga Chetana Prakashan, Varanasi, (2017).
 SHABDA PARANYAM NAAM DHATUNIRBHAR SHABDAKOSHAH'',  Vagyoga Chetana Prakashan, Varanasi, (2017).

Research papers
More than 200 research papers are published
 Rakshnadyastadasharthakah: Root Av, All India Oriental Conference, Vol. XXVII, Kurukshetra University, 1975
 The Science of Abbreviation in Ancient India, Third World Sanskrit Conference, Paris, 1977.
 Some Pāṇinian roots used only in Persian and European languages, V world Sanskrit Conference, Weimar, 1979.
 Padma Purana and Raghuvamsa, Ganganath Jha Research Journal, Vol. XXXViii, January 1982, Allahabad.

Supervision
Being Director, Research Institute, Sampurnanand Sanskrit University he has guided 53 students for PhD and 6 students for D.Litt. degree in different subjects.

Vagyoga: Natural law and mnemonic technique
Dr. Vagish Shastri has invented a unique technique of teaching Sanskrit grammar called 'Vagyoga'. This is a mnemonic method to enter in the soul of words, it is based upon natural law, which does not require learning by heart any sutras. This is a mathematical way of learning Sanskrit grammar. Many scholars from all over the world learned Sanskrit in very short time and they made translation of Sanskrit texts in their own language and many of them appointed professors.

Taught pronunciation to Madonna
Pop singer Madonna sang Yoga Taravali; Dr. Vagish Shastri found mistakes in her singing. Madonna came in touch with Dr. Shastri through BBC radio and learned pronunciation.

External links
Official Site

Photos of Vagish Shastri in Banares, February 1996
Autobiography of the VagYogi: The Life of Kundalini Experiences
"Vagyoga: Kundalini Meditation: Spiritual Experiences of Meditators" by Vagish Shastri (in English)
"Shakti, Shiva and Yoga" by Vagish Shastri (in English)
Vagyoga Association Europe

References

1935 births
2022 deaths
20th-century Indian educators
Sanskrit grammarians
Sanskrit writers
Writers from Varanasi
People from Sagar district
Indian Sanskrit scholars
Scholars from Varanasi
20th-century Indian linguists
Indian yogis
Recipients of the Padma Shri in literature & education